Teel may refer to:

Mike Teel (born 1986), American football quarterback
Teel Bivins (1947–2009), United States ambassador to Sweden 2004–2006
Teel Bruner (born 1964), American football safety

See also
Teel Middle School, Empire Union School District, Modesto, California
Teal
Teale
Theel